Witless Bay Ecological Reserve is an ecological preserve close to St. John's, Newfoundland and Labrador, Canada.
The Witless Bay Ecological Reserve consists of four islands: Gull Island, Green Island, Great Island, and Pee Pee Island. Immense numbers of birds nest on these islands during the seabird breeding season, roughly from 1 April through 1 September.

The Witless Bay reserve contains North America´s largest Atlantic puffin colony. It is estimated that more than 260,000 pairs of Atlantic puffins nest there during the late spring and summer.  The reserve also hosts the world's second-largest colony of Leach's storm-petrels. More than 620,000 pairs of these birds come here to nest every year. Thousands of black-legged kittiwakes and common murres arrive for the nesting season.

A tourism information centre is located in the reserve, by Lower Pond in the town of Witless Bay.

References

External links
Witless Bay town's web site
Witless Bay Ecological Reserve
Witless Bay Management Plan

Nature reserves in Newfoundland and Labrador
1964 establishments in Newfoundland and Labrador
Protected areas established in 1964